The 1911 Mississippi A&M Aggies football team represented the Mississippi A&M Aggies of Agricultural and Mechanical College of the State of Mississippi during the 1911 college football season. Before the week of the Egg Bowl rivalry, a new set of stands had been added on the east side of The Fairgrounds in Jackson.  As the teams prepared for kickoff the new stands collapsed injuring at least 60 people, some seriously.  Despite the disaster, the game proceeded without interruption and resulted in a 6 to 0 A&M win. The Commercial Appeal cited Hunter Kimball's playing at end in the annual Egg Bowl contest as "superb."

Schedule

References

Mississippi AandM
Mississippi State Bulldogs football seasons
Mississippi AandM Aggies football